Komitas, or Gomidas, also known as Gomidas Vartabed, birth name Soghomon Gevorgi Soghomonyan (1869–1935), was an Armenian musician.

Komitas (also spelled Gomidas) may also refer to:

Komitas
 Komitas (Catholicos), or Komitas Aghtsetsi, or Gomidas I of Armenia, Catholicos of All Armenians (615–628)
 Komitas Avenue, an avenue in Yerevan, Armenia
 Komitas Chamber Music House, a concert hall in Yetevan, Armenia
 Yerevan Komitas State Conservatory, a state-owned college of music in Yerevan, Armenia
 Komitas Museum, a museum and institute in Yetevan, Armenia
 Komitas Pantheon, Yerevan, Armenia
 Komitas Quartet, Russian string quartet

Gomidas
 Gomidas Institute, London-based academic institution dedicated to modern Armenian and regional studies
Gomidas Songs, 2008 album by Serouj Kradjian with Chamber Players of the Armenian Philharmonic conducted by Eduard Topchjan and released on Nonesuch label